Diogo Maria Mendes Leal Pereira do Amaral (born 26 November 1981) is a Portuguese actor and model who voices foreign media in the European Portuguese language.

Voice roles

Television 
 Main cast, Gustavo Martins in A Impostora,  TVI 2016
 Protagonist, Eduardo Câmara in Jardins Proibidos (2014), TVI 2014/2015
 Protagonist, Pedro Belmonte in Belmonte, TVI 2013/2014
 Protagonist, Tiago in Doce Tentação, TVI 2012/2013
 Protagonist, Diogo Tavares in Sentimentos, TVI 2009/2010
 Main cast, Joaquim Carvalho e Silva in Olhos nos Olhos, TVI, 2008/2009
 Main cast, Zé Maria in Equador, TVI, 2008
 Main cast, João in Casos da Vida (O Pedido), TVI, 2008
 Main cast, Gonçalo in Casos da Vida (Primavera todo o ano), TVI, 2008
 Main cast, Leonardo in Casos da Vida (O Caso Mariana), TVI, 2008
 Protagonist, Óscar (em 1961) in Fascínios, TVI, 2007
 Special participation, Inácio in Vingança, SIC, 2007
 Special participation, Estafeta in Aqui não há quem viva, SIC, 2006
 Protagonist, Frederico Fritzenwalden in Floribella, SIC, 2006/2007
 Main cast, Guilherme Gomes in Mundo Meu, TVI, 2005
 Antagonist, Ricardo Moura Bastos in Morangos com Açúcar, TVI, 2003/2004
 Main cast, Martim Sousa in Sonhos Traídos, TVI, 2001/2002

Television animation 
 The Grim Adventures of Billy & Mandy – Secondary characters (2001–2007)

Animated films 
 Arthur and the Minimoys – Additional voices (2006)
 M&M's-3. Fifth Sweet – The Red Savages by nickname Ron Maggy (2012)

References

External links 
 

1981 births
21st-century Portuguese male actors
Living people
Male actors from Lisbon
Portuguese feminists
Portuguese male film actors
Portuguese male models
Portuguese male television actors
Portuguese male voice actors